Michael Banwell (born June 18, 1987) is a Canadian former professional ice hockey defenseman.

Playing career
Banwell played Division 1 NCAA hockey for the University of Maine Black Bears, where he was a finance major. In his four years there, he played 109 games, totalling 18 points and 169 penalty minutes. In the 08-09 season, Banwell was tied for team leader in plus-minus rating with Gustav Nyquist.

Banwell played two seasons in the American Hockey League. During the 2011–12 season, he played for the Albany Devils. Banwell started the 2012–13 season playing for the Trenton Titans, where he played 10 games before being called up to the Worcester Sharks. He split the season between the Worcester Sharks and the Springfield Falcons. Banwell tallied a total of 7 fights this season (5 AHL, 2 ECHL). The following season, Banwell signed with the Reading Royals of the ECHL. In his third professional season, playing 60 games, he tallied 3 goals and 16 assists for 19 points with the Royals. He was also called up briefly to the Bridgeport Sound Tigers during the 2013–14 season.

Banwell signed his first contract abroad on a one-year deal with IF Björklöven of the Swedish HockeyAllsvenskan on May 9, 2015. In the 2015–16 season, he appeared in 28 games with Björklöven before agreeing to a mid-season transfer to Norwegian club, Lillehammer IK of the GET-ligaen on December 10, 2015.

Unable to help Lillehammer reach the post-season, Banwell left Norway in the off-season, returning to the ECHL in signing a one-year deal with the Utah Grizzlies on August 24, 2016.

References

External links

1987 births
Living people
Canadian ice hockey defencemen
Ice hockey people from Ontario
Albany Devils players
IF Björklöven players
Bridgeport Sound Tigers players
Greenville Road Warriors players
Lillehammer IK players
Maine Black Bears men's ice hockey players
Reading Royals players
Springfield Falcons players
Trenton Titans players
Utah Grizzlies (ECHL) players
Worcester Sharks players
Canadian expatriate ice hockey players in Norway
Canadian expatriate ice hockey players in Sweden